The Voice: la plus belle voix (season 4) is the fourth season of the French reality singing competition, created by media tycoon John de Mol.  It was aired from 10 January 2015 to 24 April 2015 on TF1.

One of the important premises of the show is the quality of the singing talent. Four coaches, themselves popular performing artists, train the talents in their group and occasionally perform with them. Talents are selected in blind auditions, where the coaches cannot see, but only hear the auditioner.

Three of the coaches continued from season 3, namely were Florent Pagny, Jenifer and Mika.  But the fourth coach Garou from seasons 1, 2 and 3 was replaced by singer Zazie being the first season for judging in the show. Lilian Renaud of Team Zazie was the fourth season winner with finale held on April 24, 2015. Anne Sila from Team Florent Pagny was the runner-up.

Overview

Results

The fourth season is won by Lilian Renaud, finalist of the team Zazie. Zazie become the first female coach to win The Voice. The runner-up, Anne Sila from team Florent Pagny, is the only one female who ranked in second place since the beginning of the show.

References

External links 
 

2015 French television seasons
The Voice: la plus belle voix